Dear My Friend is the third Japanese single released by South Korean boy band U-KISS. It was released on July 25, 2012 in Japan under Avex Trax.

Single Information
The title track "Dear My Friend" was as the ending theme to the anime television “Arashi no Yoru ni Himitsu no Tomodachi“. The coupling track “Beautiful“, which was written by member AJ, has also earned a tie-up as the CM song for Kintetsu Department store’s “Passe Bazaar” CMs.

Chart performance
The single debuted at fifth spot on Oricon Daily Single Chart. The single placed at 8th spot on its first week of chart run selling 22, 503 copies.

Track listing

Chart

Sales

References

External links

 Official website 
 Official website 

U-KISS songs
2012 singles
2012 songs
Avex Trax singles
Songs with music by H-Wonder